The Bronx County Bird Club (or BCBC) was a small informal club of birders based in the Bronx, New York, which was active between 1924 and the 1940s, with residual activity through to 1978.  Its founders were described by The New York Times Magazine in 2015  as "a group of competitive, iconoclastic young naturalists",  and by Chicago Reader in 1987 as "smart-assed teenagers" who "astounded their stuffy elders with the sightings they reported and their ability to defend the accuracy of those sightings". 

The group's interest in birding began in 1918 when John Matuszewski, his older brother Charlie, and Richard Kuerzi began looking for birds at the Hunts Point dump near where they lived, working from a copy of Chester A. Reed's Bird Guide: Land Birds East of the Rockies.  The BCBC was officially founded on November 29, 1924 by nine teenage boys: John F. Kuerzi and his brother Richard, Joseph J. Hickey, Allan D. Cruickshank, Frederick J. Ruff, Richard A. Herbert, Irving Kassoy, John E. Matuszewski and Philip Kessler.   William Vogt later became a member. About 1927, Roger Tory Peterson joined the club as its tenth member, the club having waived its unwritten rule that only Bronx residents could join.  Peterson was also the last living member of the club. Ludlow Griscom, who acted as a mentor to the club, taught Peterson how to quickly identify birds visually.  His 1923 book, Birds of the New York City Region, was depended upon by the club members. Helen G. Cruickshank, wife of Allan, was made an honorary member in either 1937 or 1978.  There were never more than 11 BCBC members.

The members purchased a used Buick which they used to travel to birding locations, with sewer outfalls and garbage dumps as popular destinations.  They found, for example, four snowy owls feeding on rats at the Hunts Point Dump. The BCBC did not limit itself to observing in the Bronx. In 1931, for example, they were reported to have made several trips to Putnam County. The club members took over 40,000 photographs covering 400 species of birds. 

A last BCBC meeting was held in early 1978 at Fort Myers, Florida, with surviving club members travelling from Florida, New York, Wisconsin, and Antarctica.

Christmas census 
In 1922, the club participated for the first time in the annual Christmas census run by the Audubon Society.  They observed 35 species in Pelham Bay, Van Cortlandt, and Bronx parks.  In the 1923 census, they found 26 species.  1925 yielded 67.  In 1926 it was 83, with 87 in 1927 and 93 in 1929.  In 1934, the club spotted 97 species, reported to be one more than they had the previous year.  By the group's twelfth census in 1935, 107 species were seen.  In later years, the Queens County Bird Club were rivals in the competition.

The club introduced a new technique, with teams of two or three assigned to survey specific areas.  This proved to be a successful strategy, with the BCBC observing more species in the eastern US than any other team for three consecutive years.  The 1935 total of 107 species was the first time any census participant had ever found more than 100.  Initially called the Bronx County Christmas Bird Count, the boundary lines were redrawn in 1940 to include lower Westchester County and renamed the Bronx-Westchester Christmas Bird Count.

The last BCBC member to participate in a Christmas count was Richard Herbert in 1956.

Additional reading

References 

1924 establishments in New York City
Ornithological organizations in the United States
Organizations based in the Bronx